Klaudia Olejniczak (born 20 January 1997) is a Polish footballer who plays as a defender for Ekstraliga club Czarni Sosnowiec. She has been a member of the Poland women's national team.

References

1997 births
Living people
People from Gostyń
Sportspeople from Greater Poland Voivodeship
Polish women's footballers
Women's association football defenders
Medyk Konin players
Poland women's international footballers